Price Rite is a chain of supermarkets found in Connecticut, Maryland, Massachusetts, New Hampshire, New Jersey, New York, Pennsylvania, and Rhode Island. Based in Keasbey, New Jersey, Price Rite is owned by New Jersey-based Wakefern Food Corporation, the cooperative behind ShopRite Supermarkets, Dearborn Market, and The Fresh Grocer. Prior to 2014, Wakefern owned and operated all Price Rite stores.

, there are 63 Price Rite stores currently operating; Wakefern itself corporately-owns and operates 60 stores outside of New Jersey, in which only 3 of those stores there are instead owned and operated by individual Wakefern members.

Overview
Similar to other limited-assortment chains, including Aldi and Save-A-Lot, Price Rite offers drastically fewer stock-keeping units (SKUs) than its sibling ShopRite stores, which are conventional supermarkets. Price Rite stores operate on the same principles as their competition; however, they are a bit bigger (averaging ) and concentrate on offering a larger “fresh food” selection.

Price Rite also emphasizes the fact that its stores are American-owned, by incorporating the phrase "An American Company" into its trademark. This is presumably to highlight the fact that much of Price Rite's competition is owned by European Union-based entities (Aldi and Lidl are both German-owned).

Due to the generic nature of the name "Price Rite", and the unfamiliarity with the brand outside the Northeast, Wakefern has also begun distributing Price Rite-branded merchandise, such as health-and-beauty, paper products, foodstuffs, and dairy products to other retail outlets, such as dollar stores, mom-and-pop pharmacies, and corner stores, along with other supermarkets such as Gristedes Operating Corp., which owns Gristedes Supermarkets in New York City. Due to Gristedes' partnership with Amazon, selected Price Rite-branded products also are available for sale on that website. Price Rite products are also the store brand for discount stores such as National Wholesale Liquidators.

For most of the chain's existence, the Wakefern cooperative has been very careful not to cannibalize sales of its member-owned ShopRite stores by opening Price Rite stores in overlapping trade areas—thus, most Price Rite stores were opened in New England or Pennsylvania, outside ShopRite's core regions. In 2013, the co-operative announced that it would allow its members to operate their own Price Rite stores. Since then, new Price Rite stores have opened within a few miles of ShopRite supermarkets in places such as: Camden and Garfield, New Jersey.

History

Price Rite Marketplace

Price Rite changed their logo and branding to "Price Rite Marketplace" in 2017. The company said that it wanted to reflect the changes that had been made in the stores since the original Price Rite limited-assortment format was launched in 1995. Accompanying the new logo and name change were updated graphics and signage. PriceRite is still a limited-assortment supermarket; however, the stores carry a larger number of SKUs (items) than many of its limited-assortment discount competition (Aldi, Lidl, Save-A-Lot.)

As ALDI and Lidl both announced aggressive expansions into the Northeast, Price Rite spent 2018 and 2019 remodeling most of its store base to the Price Rite Marketplace format.  In 2019, as competition heated up, PriceRite quietly shuttered underperforming stores in Woodbridge, Virginia; Vestal, New York and a longtime store in Brockton, Massachusetts.

Price Rite Limited Assortment Stores

It was 1995 when Wakefern Food Corporation opened its first limited-assortment concept store in West Springfield, Massachusetts. After failing to successfully enter the warehouse club concept with their PriceRite Warehouse Club (see below), Wakefern assigned the Price Rite name to its newest prototype: a limited-assortment, deep-discount supermarket meant to do battle with the no-frills operators which were successfully spreading across North America, such as Aldi, Food Basics, and Save-a-Lot.

In the years since the first Price Rite opened, the concept has been tweaked to emphasize the size and freshness of the perishable departments in comparison to its competition. Newer stores, such as the Price Rite of Brockton, Massachusetts (at over ), are also larger than most of the earlier stores. Wakefern has also used the concept as a replacement for under-performing ShopRite stores or in regions where the Price Rite concept was thought to be more successful. As a result, under-performing ShopRite supermarkets in places such as York, Pennsylvania and Wethersfield, Connecticut, have been converted to very successful Price Rite stores, keeping jobs and a supermarket in these towns. The Torrington, Connecticut Price Rite was a former ShopRite store that had sat unused for almost 10 years before it was opened as Price Rite.

Price Rite stores which opened in the 1990s or early 2000s lack the service departments found in conventional modern supermarkets, such as Deli, Bakery, Meat, and Seafood. These service departments are replaced by pre-packaged offerings prepared at centralized facilities which reduces cost for the store. More recently opened stores have started to add certain service departments, depending on both space available and on regional requirements. In Baltimore, a Price Rite store which opened in 2012 has a Full-Service Seafood Department, reflecting local tastes that favor a fresher, more diverse seafood selection; New Hampshire's first Price Rite store, opening in 2015 in Manchester, features a full-service deli.

In 2008, Wakefern opened the first Price Rite Marketplace store, in Providence, Rhode Island, at a former Shaw's. Other non-standard features in the Providence Price Rite have included a fresh-roasted peanut stand, and store-made mozzarella cheese. As with most Price Rite stores, the Providence store has a significant focus on ethnic items, with an entire aisle of Goya products, and an aisle of Italian items including fresh pasta and specialty cheeses.

In 2005, a Price Rite store was opened in Azusa, California, in partnership with K.V.Mart Co., which is an independent supermarket operator in southern California. A second store followed in the Los Angeles suburb of Hawaiian Gardens. Both stores were closed in 2013 and the partnership between Wakefern and K.V.Mart Co. was ended.
 
In 2014, Wakefern announced that the Price Rite banner was to be made available to all of its cooperative members, so they can open and operate their own Price Rite outlets. The first of these stores, which is owned and operated by cooperative member Inserra Supermarkets Inc., opened on July 1, 2014, in Garfield, New Jersey.

Price Rite Bermuda
In 2007, a Price Rite store was opened in Pembroke, Bermuda, marking the first Price Rite store outside of the U.S.
The store is owned and operated by The Marketplace Group Ltd. of Bermuda, which owns 7 Marketplace Supermarkets and has been a wholesale customer of Wakefern for years, even selling ShopRite-branded products in its Marketplace stores in Bermuda. On January 20, 2016, the company opened a second, larger Price Rite store in the Bermuda parish of Warwick.  The Bermuda stores operate under a franchise agreement with Wakefern, and The Marketplace Group Ltd. is not a Wakefern member.  While these stores use the Price Rite logo, the merchandise mix differs significantly from the U.S. stores.  The Bermuda stores are more similar to warehouse clubs,  selling mostly bulk-sized and club-sized products, as well as toys, electronics and softlines.  The stores sell Price Rite-branded merchandise, but also feature Costco Wholesale's Kirkland Signature brand as well as national brands. The Bermuda stores operate their own website, separately from the U.S. stores: www.pricerite.bm

PriceRite Warehouse Clubs
During the 1980s and early 1990s, many American supermarket chains experimented with opening their own warehouse clubs to compete with the new clubs that were invading their trade areas and stealing their business. SuperValu had Max-Club, Meijer had SourceClub, H-E-B had its Bodega clubs, and Wakefern decided to follow suit with PriceRite clubs. Wakefern defined PriceRite as a "mini-club", and at under , promoted it as a convenient alternative to the massive conventional clubs.

The logo initially used for PriceRite was the same as a former ShopRite logo, only instead of the graphic of a shopping carriage with circles inside, there was a flatbed cart with square boxes on it to symbolize the wholesale nature of the PriceRite Mini Clubs. (This saved costs on new sign-frames for the stores, since they all were previously a ShopRite and already had round sign-frames.)

PriceRite Mini-Clubs were opened in buildings that had previously housed ailing or outdated ShopRite stores and had been simply retrofitted with warehouse-type shelving. Thus, they lacked size, and did not have enough of a following to attract shoppers away from the true warehouse competition (Sam's Club, BJ's Wholesale Club and Price Club), which were opening all over the New York and Philadelphia metropolitan areas.

Wakefern members operated PriceRite mini-clubs in Rockaway Borough, Fishkill, New York and Toms River, New Jersey. The last Price Rite club closed in 1994.

See also
 ShopRite (United States)
Wakefern Food Corporation

References

External links
 Price Rite
 Price Rite Bermuda

Wakefern Food Corporation
Supermarkets of the United States
Companies based in Middlesex County, New Jersey
American companies established in 1995
Retail companies established in 1995
Woodbridge Township, New Jersey
Retailers' cooperatives in the United States